Charles de Tornaco (7 June 1927 – 18 September 1953) was a racing driver from Belgium.  He participated in 4 Formula One World Championship Grands Prix, debuting on 22 June 1952.  He scored no championship points.

De Tornaco was the co-founder of Ecurie Belgique, which later became Ecurie Francorchamps, and most of his racing career was with this team, driving Ferraris. In practice for the Modena Grand Prix in 1953, de Tornaco rolled his car and suffered serious head and neck injuries. There were no adequate medical facilities present, and he died on his way to hospital in a private saloon car.

Complete Formula One World Championship results
(key)

Non-Championship Formula One results
(key) (Races in bold indicate pole position; Races in italics indicate fastest lap)

References

1927 births
1953 deaths
Belgian racing drivers
Belgian Formula One drivers
Ecurie Francorchamps Formula One drivers
24 Hours of Le Mans drivers
Racing drivers who died while racing
World Sportscar Championship drivers
24 Hours of Spa drivers
Sport deaths in Italy
Racing drivers from Brussels